Kot Momin (Punjabi,),  is a town and Tehsil headquarters in Sargodha district, Punjab, Pakistan. On June 21, 2003, chief minister of Punjab, Chaudhry Pervaiz Elahi announced it as a Tehsil. Kot Momin is almost 40 Km away from Sargodha city. This place is most famous for citrus fruit (Kinno, Malta etc.) After that day it is recognized as Kot Momin Tehsil of Sargodha district. Kot Momin is situated among various historical cities.

Demography 
The population is 70,000 (2012 estimate), mainly Muslim and Punjabi speaking. A few Christian populations also lives there. Kot Momin is almost 40  km from Sargodha city. This place is most famous for citrus fruit Kinno (a type of orange). It is linked with Lahore and Islamabad by M2 motorway.

Education
Following are the notable educational institutes in Kot Momin:
The Superior College, Kot Momin Campus
Punjab College of Science, Kot Momin Campus 
Government High school for boys.
Government Higher secondary school for girls.
Dar ul Huda Model High School, Kot Momin
Reader Group of College Kotmomin
[NBL Marketing Pvt Ltd] Kot Momin

References

 Populated places in Sargodha District